The kingdom of Ouarsenis was an independent Berber kingdom located in the Ouarsenis region in the north of present-day Algeria.

History 
In 430, the tribes of Ouarsenis/Hodna established a kingdom and established its capital at the Roman city of "Timgarta," which they named "Tihert" (today called Tiaret). The Kingdom was located in central Algeria. Ortayas was one of its monarchs.

See also 
 Mauro-Roman Kingdom
 Exarchate of Africa

References

Bibliography 
 Barnes, Timothy . The New Empire of Diocletian and Constantine. Cambridge, MA: Harvard University Press, 1982. 
 Camps, G. Rex gentium Maurorum et Romanorum. Recherches sur les royaumes de Maurétanie des VIe et VIIe siècles
 Hrbek, I., ed. General History of Africa III: Africa From the Seventh to the Eleventh Century.
 
 Modéran, Y. Kusayla, l'Afrique et les Arabes. In "Identités et Cultures dans l'Algérie Antique", University of Rouen, 2005.
 

States and territories established in the 430s
730s disestablishments
 
Ouarsenis
Medieval Algeria
Berber dynasties
Barbarian kingdoms